is a castle structure in Uda, Nara Prefecture, Japan. The site was designated a National Historic Site.

In 1600, Fukushima Masanori's younger brother Fukushima Takaharu became the lord of the castle.  The castle was demolished by Tokugawa shogunate`s one country one castle rule in 1615.

Current
The castle is now only ruins, just some stone walls and moats. The castle was listed as one of the Continued Top 100 Japanese Castles in 2017.

See also
List of Historic Sites of Japan (Nara)

Literature

References

Castles in Nara Prefecture
Historic Sites of Japan
Former castles in Japan
Ruined castles in Japan
Uda, Nara
Buildings and structures demolished in the 17th century